Below is the list of populated places in Nevşehir Province, Turkey by the districts. In the following lists first place in each list is the administrative center of the district.

Nevşehir
 Nevşehir
 Alacaşar, Nevşehir		
 Balcın, Nevşehir		
 Basansarnıç, Nevşehir		
 Boğaz, Nevşehir		
 Çardak, Nevşehir		
 Çat, Nevşehir		
 Çiftlikköy, Nevşehir		
 Göre, Nevşehir		
 Göreme, Nevşehir		
 Güvercinlik, Nevşehir

Acıgöl
 Acıgöl
 Ağıllı, Acıgöl		
 Bağlıca, Acıgöl		
 Çullar, Acıgöl		
 İnallı, Acıgöl		
 Karacaören, Acıgöl		
 Karapınar, Acıgöl		
 Kozluca, Acıgöl		
 Kurugöl, Acıgöl		
 Tatların, Acıgöl		
 Tepeköy, Acıgöl		
 Topaç, Acıgöl		
 Yuva, Acıgöl

Avanos
 Avanos
 Akarca, Avanos		
 Aktepe, Avanos		
 Altıpınar, Avanos		
 Bozca, Avanos		
 Büyükayhan, Avanos		
 Çalış, Avanos		
 Çavuşin, Avanos		
 Göynük, Avanos		
 İğdelikışla, Avanos		
 Kalaba, Avanos		
 Karacauşağı, Avanos		
 Kuyulukışla, Avanos		
 Küçükayhan, Avanos		
 Mahmat, Avanos		
 Özkonak, Avanos		
 Paşalı, Avanos		
 Topaklı, Avanos		
 Üçkuyu, Avanos

Derinkuyu
 Derinkuyu
 Çakıllı, Derinkuyu		
 Doğala, Derinkuyu		
 Güneyce, Derinkuyu		
 Kuyulutatlar, Derinkuyu		
 Özlüce, Derinkuyu		
 Suvermez, Derinkuyu		
 Til, Derinkuyu		
 Yazıhüyük, Derinkuyu

Gülşehir
 Gülşehir
 Abuuşağı, Gülşehir		
 Alemli, Gülşehir		
 Alkan, Gülşehir		
 Bölükören, Gülşehir		
 Civelek, Gülşehir		
 Dadağı, Gülşehir		
 Eğrikuyu, Gülşehir		
 Emmiler, Gülşehir		
 Eskiyaylacık, Gülşehir		
 Fakıuşağı, Gülşehir		
 Gökçetoprak, Gülşehir		
 Gülpınar, Gülşehir		
 Gümüşkent, Gülşehir		
 Gümüşyazı, Gülşehir		
 Hacıhalilli, Gülşehir		
 Hacılar, Gülşehir		
 Hamzalı, Gülşehir		
 Karacaşar, Gülşehir		
 Karahüyük, Gülşehir		
 Kızılkaya, Gülşehir		
 Oğulkaya, Gülşehir		
 Ovaören, Gülşehir		
 Şahinler, Gülşehir		
 Terlemez, Gülşehir		
 Tuzköyü, Gülşehir		
 Yakatarla, Gülşehir		
 Yalıntaş, Gülşehir		
 Yamalı, Gülşehir		
 Yeniyaylacık, Gülşehir		
 Yeşilli, Gülşehir		
 Yeşilöz, Gülşehir		
 Yeşilyurt, Gülşehir		
 Yüksekli, Gülşehir

Hacıbektaş
Hacıbektaş		
 Akçataş, Hacıbektaş		
 Anapınar, Hacıbektaş		
 Aşağıbarak, Hacıbektaş		
 Aşıklar, Hacıbektaş		
 Avuç, Hacıbektaş		
 Başköy, Hacıbektaş		
 Belbarak, Hacıbektaş		
 Büyükburunağıl, Hacıbektaş		
 Büyükkışla, Hacıbektaş		
 Çiğdem, Hacıbektaş		
 Çivril, Hacıbektaş		
 Hasanlar, Hacıbektaş		
 Hıdırlar, Hacıbektaş		
 Hırkatepesidelik, Hacıbektaş		
 İlicek, Hacıbektaş		
 Karaburç, Hacıbektaş		
 Karaburna, Hacıbektaş		
 Karaova, Hacıbektaş		
 Kayaaltı, Hacıbektaş		
 Kayı, Hacıbektaş		
 Kızılağıl, Hacıbektaş		
 Killik, Hacıbektaş		
 Kisecik, Hacıbektaş		
 Köşektaş, Hacıbektaş		
 Kütükçü, Hacıbektaş		
 Mikail, Hacıbektaş		
 Sadık, Hacıbektaş		
 Yenice, Hacıbektaş		
 Yeniyapan, Hacıbektaş		
 Yurtyeri, Hacıbektaş

Kozaklı
 Kozaklı		
 Abdi, Kozaklı		
 Akpınar, Kozaklı		
 Aylı, Kozaklı		
 Belekli, Kozaklı		
 Boğaziçi, Kozaklı		
 Büyükyağlı, Kozaklı		
 Cağşak, Kozaklı		
 Çayiçi, Kozaklı		
 Doyduk, Kozaklı		
 Dörtyol, Kozaklı		
 Gerce, Kozaklı		
 Hacıfakılı, Kozaklı		
 Hızıruşağı, Kozaklı		
 İmran, Kozaklı		
 Kalecik, Kozaklı		
 Kanlıca, Kozaklı		
 Kapaklı, Kozaklı		
 Karahasanlı, Kozaklı		
 Karasenir, Kozaklı		
 Kaşkışla, Kozaklı		
 Kuruağıl, Kozaklı		
 Küçükyağlı, Kozaklı		
 Küllüce, Kozaklı		
 Merdanali, Kozaklı		
 Özce, Kozaklı		
 Taşlıhüyük, Kozaklı		
 Yassıca, Kozaklı

Ürgüp
 Ürgüp		
 Akköy, Ürgüp		
 Ayvalı, Ürgüp		
 Bahçeli, Ürgüp		
 Başdere, Ürgüp		
 Boyalı, Ürgüp		
 Cemil, Ürgüp		
 Çökek, Ürgüp		
 Demirtaş, Ürgüp		
 İbrahimpaşa, Ürgüp		
 İltaş, Ürgüp		
 Karacaören, Ürgüp		
 Karain, Ürgüp		
 Karakaya, Ürgüp		
 Karlık, Ürgüp		
 Mazı, Ürgüp		
 Mustafapaşa, Ürgüp		
 Ortahisar, Ürgüp		
 Sarıhıdır, Ürgüp		
 Sofular, Ürgüp		
 Şahinefendi, Ürgüp		
 Taşkınpaşa, Ürgüp		
 Ulaşlı, Ürgüp		
 İcik, Nevşehir		
 Kavak, Nevşehir		
 Kaymaklı, Nevşehir		
 Nar, Nevşehir		
 Özyayla, Nevşehir		
 Sulusaray, Nevşehir		
 Uçhisar, Nevşehir

References

List
Nevsehir